"Feel Like I Do" is the first single from American rock band Drowning Pool's self-titled album. It was released to radio on February 9, 2010. It was used during the broadcast of the 2010 NFL Draft on ESPN. It was also used as part of the soundtrack for Saints Row: The Third. "Feel Like I Do" is the highest-charting single by Drowning Pool to date, reaching #4 on the Billboard Hot Mainstream Rock Tracks chart, and surpassing "37 Stitches", which peaked at #5. It is the band's second top-5 hit on that chart.

Music video

The music video for the song premiered on 20 January 2010. It features the band playing in a large white room with two small metal staircases on either side of a metal platform, with a smaller one in front of it which the drummer is seated on. Over the course of the video, groups of diverse people can be seen singing along during the chorus. The song ends with the groups surrounding the platform and dancing to the song. The music video also features a unique camera effect.

Charts

References

Drowning Pool songs
American rock songs
2010 singles
Songs written by Stevie Benton
2010 songs
Eleven Seven Label Group singles
Songs written by Ryan McCombs